Juraj Kledrowetz (born July 6, 1970) is a Slovak former professional ice hockey defenceman.

In his career, Kledrowetz played a total of 896 games in the Slovak Extraliga where he played for MHk 32 Liptovský Mikuláš, HC Košice and HK SKP Poprad HK SKP Poprad.

Career statistics

External links

1970 births
Living people
HC Košice players
MHk 32 Liptovský Mikuláš players
HK Poprad players
Sportspeople from Liptovský Mikuláš
Slovak ice hockey defencemen